The 2021 Cary Challenger was a professional tennis tournament being played on hard courts. It was the 7th edition of the tournament which was part of the 2021 ATP Challenger Tour. It took place in Cary, North Carolina, United States between 19 and 25 July 2021.

Singles main-draw entrants

Seeds

 1 Rankings are as of July 12, 2021.

Other entrants
The following players received wildcards into the singles main draw:
  William Blumberg
  Govind Nanda
  Sam Riffice

The following player received entry into the singles main draw using a protected ranking:
  James Ward

The following players received entry from the qualifying draw:
  Alexis Galarneau
  Aleksandar Kovacevic
  Shintaro Mochizuki
  Genaro Alberto Olivieri

The following player received entry as a lucky loser:
  Aidan McHugh

Champions

Singles

 Mitchell Krueger def.  Ramkumar Ramanathan 7–6(7–4), 6–2.

Doubles

 Christian Harrison /  Dennis Novikov def.  Petros Chrysochos /  Michail Pervolarakis 6–3, 6–3.

References

2021 ATP Challenger Tour
2021
2021 in American tennis
July 2021 sports events in the United States